France Roche (2 April 1921 – 14 December 2013) was a French film actress and screenwriter. She appeared in 17 films between 1951 and 1979. She was a member of the jury at the 11th Berlin International Film Festival.

Selected filmography
 Without Leaving an Address (1951)
 Adorables créatures (1952)
 Follow That Man (1953)
 The Red Cloak (1955)
 Pity for the Vamps (1956)
 Amour de poche (1957)
 Les Lions sont lâchés (1961; writer)
 Nuit d'ivresse (1986)

References

External links

1921 births
2013 deaths
French film actresses
French women screenwriters
French screenwriters
People from Saint-Tropez
20th-century French actresses